Prestons is a suburb of Sydney, in the state of New South Wales, Australia 37 kilometres south-west of the Sydney central business district, in the local government area of the City of Liverpool.

History
Prestons was named after a local Irish family who in the 1910s ran a small post office on the corner of Romana Square (which has since been removed in the urbanization stages of Preston's development). 
The family's maiden name was Preston and they were well known for being friendly and helpful to the small community, donating food and household items to those in need. Hence, their name became synonymous with the post office and in 1972, it officially became the name of the suburb.

Schools

Schools in the suburb include Dalmeny and Prestons Public School.  Private schools include, William Carey Christian School, Saint Catherine of Siena Catholic Primary School and the former Sule College, now known as Amity College.

Transport
Prestons is situated at an important road junction (Sir Roden Cutler VC Memorial Interchange) where the M5 South Western Motorway from the city meets the Hume Motorway heading towards Canberra and Melbourne and the Westlink M7 heading towards Mount Druitt and northern Sydney. All three roads can be accessed from Camden Valley Way, which also connects Prestons to Liverpool and Camden. The M7 can also be accessed from Bernera Road. Prestons is serviced by trains to the city via Granville and the Airport from Glenfield and Edmondson Park stations. Interline Bus Services provides three bus services to Liverpool via different routes. One of these, route 850, also connects to Narellan.

Sport
The Prestons Cricket Club (Hornets) operates from Amalfi Park, since it was founded in 1968.
Prestons Robins Little Athletics operates every Wednesday and Friday nights at the new park on Ash Road during summer months.

People
According to the 2016 Australian census, Prestons had a population of 15 315 people. The most common countries of birth, other than Australia (53.1%), were Fiji (7.4%), Philippines (3.9%), India (3.1%), Vietnam (1.8%) and New Zealand (1.8%). The most common foreign languages spoken at home were Hindi (9.0%), Arabic (6.5%) and Spanish (3.3%). While Catholicism was the most common religion (32.2%), Islam was the second most common with 14.6%, ahead of Hinduism with 9.6%.

References

Suburbs of Sydney
Hume Highway
City of Liverpool (New South Wales)